Nationality words link to articles with information on the nation's poetry or literature (for instance, Irish or France).

Events

885:
 Approximate date of establishment of Preslav Literary School in Bulgaria

886:
 Establishment of Ohrid Literary School in Bulgaria.

Works published

880:
 Approximate date of the Sequence of Saint Eulalia
 Approximate date of the Ballad of the Lady Ch'in, about the Huang-ch’ao Rebellion, by Wei Zhuang

Births
Death years link to the corresponding "[year] in poetry" article. There are conflicting or unreliable sources for the birth years of many people born in this period; where sources conflict, the poet is listed again and the conflict is noted:

886:
 Ōnakatomi no Yorimoto (died 958), one of the Thirty-six Poetry Immortals of Japan

889:
 Minamoto no Kintada, one of the Thirty-six Poetry Immortals of Japan

Deaths
Birth years link to the corresponding "[year] in poetry" article:

880:
 Ariwara no Narihira (born 825), one of the Six best Waka poets

881:
 Lu Guimeng (born unknown), Chinese poet

883:
 Pi Rixiu (born 834), Tang Dynasty poet and magistrate

See also

 Poetry
 9th century in poetry
 9th century in literature
 List of years in poetry

Other events:
 Other events of the 12th century
 Other events of the 13th century

9th century:
 9th century in poetry
 9th century in literature

Notes

Poetry by year
Poetry